Miva is a locality split between the Gympie Region and the Fraser Coast Region in Queensland, Australia. > In the  Miva had a population of 57 people.

Geography 
Miva's eastern boundary is the Mary River. Its western boundary is the Bauple-Woolooga Road. Miva is almost entirely within the Gympie Region apart from a small section in the north-east of the locality which is part of the Fraser Coast Region. The lower parts of the locality near the river and along the valleys (elevation 20–70 metres are used for farming). The hilly land to the west rises to peaks of 100 metres and the hilly land to the south-east rises to a peak of 150 metres; the hilly land is undeveloped bushland.

The former Kingaroy branch railway passed through Miva from the east to the south-west; Miva was served by the now-abandoned Miva railway station (.)

History
The name Miva is taken from the name of a pastoral run belonging to Gideon Scott, a pastoralist in March 1851. It is thought to be an Aboriginal word indicating either stony knob or Moreton Bay chestnut.

Prior to this a punt operated on the river crossing at Miva.

The Nanango railway line opened in December 1886 as far as Kilkivan.

Miva Provisional School opened about 1888 becoming Miva State School on 1 Jan 1909. In 1922 became a halftime provisional school, sharing its teacher with the Sexton Provisional School, before closing in 1924. It reopened in 1926 as a provisional school, but closed finally about 1934.

Miva Post Office opened by May 1908 (a receiving office had been open from 1888) and closed in 1976.

In the  Miva had a population of 57 people.

Heritage listings 

Miva has a number of heritage-listed sites, including:
 across the Mary River: Dickabram Bridge

Community groups
The Miva branch of the Queensland Country Women's Association meets at the QCWA Miva Rooms at 1186 Miva Road.

References

Further reading

 

Gympie Region
Fraser Coast Region
Localities in Queensland